Lucas Exequiel Triviño Rodríguez (born 24 April 1992) is an Argentine–born Chilean footballer who currently plays for Chilean Segunda División side Colchagua.

Honours
Trasandino
 Tercera A: 2012

References

External links
 
 
 

1992 births
Living people
People from La Plata Partido
Footballers from La Plata
Naturalized citizens of Chile
Argentine footballers
Argentine expatriate footballers
Association football forwards
Ñublense footballers
Trasandino footballers
San Antonio Unido footballers
Malleco Unido footballers
Cobreloa footballers
Deportes Colchagua footballers
Chilean Primera División players
Primera B de Chile players
Segunda División Profesional de Chile players
Argentine expatriate sportspeople in Chile
Expatriate footballers in Chile